Gamma-aminobutyric acid (GABA) A receptor, alpha 5, also known as GABRA5, is a protein which in humans is encoded by the GABRA5 gene.

Function
GABA is the major inhibitory neurotransmitter in the mammalian brain where it acts at GABAA receptors, which are ligand-gated chloride channels. Chloride conductance of these channels can be modulated by agents such as benzodiazepines that bind to the GABAA receptor. At least 16 distinct subunits of GABAA receptors have been identified. Transcript variants utilizing three different alternative non-coding first exons have been described.

Subunit selective ligands
Recent research has produced several ligands which are moderately selective for GABAA receptors containing the α5 subunit. These have proved to be useful in investigating some of the side effects of benzodiazepine and nonbenzodiazepine drugs, particularly the effects on learning and memory such as anterograde amnesia. Inverse agonists at this subunit have nootropic effects and may be useful for the treatment of cognitive disorders such as Alzheimer's disease.

Agonists
 QH-ii-066
 SH-053-R-CH3-2′F

Antagonists
 α5IA
 Basmisanil (RG-1662, RO5186582): derivative of Ro4938581, negative allosteric modulator at GABAA α5, in human trials for treating cognitive deficit in Down syndrome.
 L-655,708
 MRK-016
 PWZ-029: moderate inverse agonist
 Pyridazines
 Ro4938581
 TB-21007

See also
 GABAA receptor

References

Further reading

External links
 

Ion channels
Biology of bipolar disorder